"Unleashed" is episode 3 of season 5 in the television show Angel. Written by Elizabeth Craft and Sarah Fain and directed by Marita Grabiak, it was originally broadcast on October 15, 2003 on the WB network. A young woman named Nina gets bitten and undergoes a transformation into a werewolf  during the three nights of the lunar cycle during which the moon is most illuminated (full moon, and the previous and next nights). Angel tries to help Nina, unaware that she is being hunted by an exclusive club which specializes in exotic meals.

Plot
A woman named Nina (Jenny Mollen) is bitten by a werewolf. Nina runs off before Angel kills the werewolf. As there are two more nights in which Nina will become a werewolf, she must be located, since she will not know what is happening. Spike asks Fred to investigate his disappearances to the "netherworld", which are lasting longer. 

Nina wakes up at home and heads to her kitchen. Her hearing is improved and she does not remember the bruise on her neck. She studies hamburgers that her sister Jill and niece Amanda are cooking, and imagines slashing Amanda's neck. That night, Nina turns into a werewolf, but is abducted and sedated by Angel and Wesley.

The next day, Nina wakes up in a cell. Angel shows her a video of herself as a wolf. She is upset with her condition and that she wanted to hurt Amanda. Nina asks whether he can cure her and Angel admits he cannot. Angel meets with Fred and Royce, who warns that Nina might hurt herself, but she might be okay if they take her back to her home; the familiarity will calm her. Angel releases Nina with Fred. 

Fred tells Jill and Amanda that Nina left because Fred needed her help. Nina and Jill argue and Nina leaves while Fred grabs things for her. They return to their van, but the security guards are dead. A man knocks Fred out and kidnaps Nina. At Wolfram & Hart, Royce sings "Jessie's Girl" for Lorne, who confirms that he is clean. The others try to figure out who grabbed Nina. 

Fred finds a vial in Royce's trash that contained Calendula; Royce suspected he would have to sing for Lorne, so he took a drug to appear clean. Fred finds a menu for a banquet hosted by restaurant entrepreneur John Crane, whose employees abducted Nina after Royce informed him about her. Crane has gathered gourmets wishing to dine on werewolf meat. 

The gang heads to the banquet hall and Angel frees Nina, but the gang is surrounded by men with guns. Nina turns into a werewolf, helping the group before Wesley tranquilizes her. Angel announces that they are leaving, but Crane declares that he promised his guests a werewolf. Werewolf Nina bites Royce's leg, and Angel points out that in a month, Crane will have another werewolf to eat. Crane considers this an acceptable resolution.

Fred returns to her office to find Spike. He tells her that he was not sure he would return from the netherworld. Fred vows to find a way to keep him in the world. Angel drives Nina home as she asks how he lives with having killed people. Angel tells her that she will accept being a werewolf, and does not have to tell Jill and Amanda until she is ready.

Production
Producer Jeffrey Bell says, "Nina is not becoming a regular, but there was good chemistry so we’ve talked about bringing her back. There are no master plans for Angel and werewolf girl but we’re always open to the possibility."

The werewolves were designed by Robert Hall, of special effects agency Almost Human, and were an intentional departure from the werewolf costume worn by Oz's character on Buffy the Vampire Slayer. "They were saying Oz looked like a gay possum," Hall says. He decided to design the werewolf with sparse hair so that the muscles underneath were clearly visible. "The script wanted a big, bad wolf," he explains. "I think it literally said, 'Don't make it look like a gay possum.'"

References

External links

 

Angel (season 5) episodes
2003 American television episodes
Television episodes about werewolves